Christopher Lawrence "Bong" Tesoro Go (born June 14, 1974) is a Filipino politician serving as a Senator since 2019. He previously served in the Cabinet of President Rodrigo Duterte as Special Assistant to the President and Head of the Presidential Management Staff from June 2016 to October 2018. Go has served as the personal aide and special assistant to Duterte since 1998, back when Duterte was still mayor of Davao City.

He also currently chairs the Senate committee on health and demography.

Early life and education
Go was born on June 14, 1974, to a Chinese Filipino family. He is the son of Davao-based businessman Desiderio Go and Batangas-native Marichu Tesoro-Go. He is a grandson of August Tesoro, who founded one of the largest printing companies in Davao City.

Go attended La Salle Green Hills during his high school years. He initially took up a management degree in De La Salle University but transferred to and eventually graduated from Ateneo de Davao University with a bachelor's degree in marketing.

Career

Duterte's aide (1998–present)

Since 1998, Bong Go has served as executive assistant and personal aide for then-Mayor of Davao City Rodrigo Duterte. Being in charge of both personal and official matters, he has called himself as Duterte's all around 'utility man'.

During the 2016 election campaign season, Go was often described as the "national photobomber" by the media, for being always in the photos at the side of Duterte in his campaign sorties. He is one of the key people in Duterte's campaign for presidency. On October 15, 2015, Go filed Duterte's certificate of candidacy on Duterte's behalf at the Comelec office in Manila, for a re-election bid for the Davao City mayoralty post.

Special Assistant to the President (2016–2018)
Then President-elect Rodrigo Duterte on June 2, 2016, announced the appointment of Christopher Go as the Special Assistant to the President and is tasked to provide general supervision to the Presidential Management Staff.

During his time as Special Assistant to the President, his alleged involvement in the Philippine Navy's  frigate deal was revealed by online news site Rappler. Pertinent documents that linked Bong Go to the deal, detailing how he had interfered with the process, violating several procurement laws when he endorsed a supplier outside the bidding process were released to the public. Bong Go denied the allegations, declaring that he would resign if ever he was proven guilty and claimed that the media and his critics are endangering national security. Vice Admiral Mercado of the Philippine Navy, who was allegedly sacked for questioning the frigate deal, has cleared Go of any involvement, claiming that Go had never communicated with those who were involved in the deal. Duterte defended Go, saying that "he owns a yacht, therefore he doesn't need to steal in the frigate deal". The Malacañang also made their stand clear that Bong Go did not intervene. A probe by the Senate regarding the deal was made, but did no further clarifications about Go's role on the deal.

During his time as Special Assistant to the President, he became known for selfies he posted online, saying he values these images as part of his "personal collection".

Senator (2019–present)
Bong Go made a formal bid for the Senate on October 15, 2018, when he filed his certificate of candidacy accompanied by President Rodrigo Duterte and other members of the president's Cabinet. Go's platform for his Senate bid includes pledges to build healthcare and social service facilities dubbed as "Malasakit Centers" across the Philippines as well as the repeal of the Juvenile Justice law which sets the minimum age of criminal liability at 15 years old. Doubts about his capability to conduct a nationwide campaign was countered by President Duterte, noting that the Tesoros, Go's mother's family, own one of the largest printing firms in Mindanao.

Even before his formal filing of candidacy, Go has already been subject of allegations of premature campaigning. In relief operations after a fire in Manila, relief goods with "Ready Set Go" branding were distributed alongside government relief goods provided by the Department of Social Welfare and Development. Go has repeatedly denied that he was personally involved in the production or distribution of any merchandise, once citing his supporters as producing them without his consent and on one occasion said that it was done under the President's directive. He also urged his supporters to stopped "politicizing" their cause by using his name and likeness. Calls for tarpaulins bearing his image to be removed had made the rounds in social media.

After the election, Go garnered roughly 21 million votes and was sworn into office after placing 3rd overall, he officially took his seat in the Senate beginning his term on June 30, 2019. On his first months in office, Go had filed several bills including creating a Department of Disaster Resilience, the postponement of the 2020 Sangguniang Kabataan elections on the barangay level, and a bill co-authored with fellow Senator Manny Pacquiao pushing a death penalty back for heinous crimes such as illegal drugs, plunder, rape, and murder.

In 2019, Go authored the Malasakit Center Act, which meant to serve as one-stop for easy access to medical and financial assistance needed to receive health care services. Amid the COVID-19 pandemic, Go proposed the Balik Probinsya program, which meant to decongest the overcrowded Metro Manila once the coronavirus pandemic is put under control. The program was institutionalized by President Duterte on May 6 via Executive Order No. 114.

On July 17, 2020, Go was involved in a controversy when a college student was filed a subpoena order by the NBI after Bong Go complained of the student sharing a post on social media possibly containing fake news which were against the Senator.

On October 29, 2021, Go led the opening of the country's 146th Malasakit Center at the Las Piñas General Hospital and Satellite Trauma Center in Las Piñas City — reaching a milestone for the said program being the 30th in Metro Manila and the first in the city.

2022 elections

PDP-Laban initially nominated Go to be their presidential candidate, with President Duterte as their candidate for vice president on September 8, 2021. However, Duterte withdrew from his vice presidential bid, and Go filed a certificate of candidacy for the position of vice president instead. Go filed his certificate of candidacy on October 2, 2021. Fellow Senator Ronald dela Rosa then became his running mate after he unexpectedly filed his certificate of candidacy on October 8.

Dela Rosa withdrew his bid under the directive of PDP-Laban. Go also followed suit withdrawing his bid for the vice presidency on November 13, 2021. Go then announced that he would be running for president instead, albeit under the Pederalismo ng Dugong Dakilang Samahan (PDDS) party rather than PDP-Laban. He substituted the candidacy of PDDS' Grepor Belgica, father of Greco Belgica. Go explained that he withdrew his bid to run for vice president to avoid complicating the campaign of Sara Duterte who launched her own vice president bid under Lakas–CMD. Despite officially running for a different party, he vowed to continue to the plans of incumbent President Duterte's administration.

The faction of PDP–Laban led by Alfonso Cusi allowed Go to run under a different party as a bid to avoid complication since the party is under a leadership dispute. The other faction is led by Manny Pacquiao and Koko Pimentel who disputed the legitimacy of Cusi's faction as representatives of the party. Cusi's side anticipate that there would be legal issues had Go substituted the candidacy of Ronald dela Rosa as president if the COMELEC ruled dela Rosa's candidacy as invalid. Cusi's PDP-Laban has adopted and endorse Go as their presidential candidate for the 2022 election.

The Go campaign has no formal vice president candidate. President Rodrigo Duterte has endorsed his daughter Sara Duterte as Go's vice president.

On November 30, 2021, Go announced he would be dropping out of the presidential race saying his heart and mind contradicted his actions and cited his family's opposition to his move to run as president. He formally withdrew from the presidential race on December 14, 2021.

Personal life
Beyond politics, Bong Go is also an avid basketball fan and has participated in amateur leagues and guested in prominent local basketball events in the country. He usually watches the Philippine Basketball Association and joined the three-point shooting competition of the 2018 PBA All-Star Week. Along with Senators Sonny Angara and Joel Villanueva, Go was featured in a three-point shoot out exhibition during the 2018 FIBA 3x3 World Cup which was hosted in Bocaue, Bulacan.

Go also joined the roster of the Muntinlupa Cagers of the Maharlika Pilipinas Basketball League. This move was objected by his critics as using the MPBL as a platform for his senatorial bid in 2019. Go defended the move saying he just wanted to promote basketball in the country and acknowledged his old age and the superior height of his opponents. He rarely played appearing in only one season with the team, to focus on his Senate job and on assisting Duterte as his personal assistant.

References

External links
 
 

1974 births
Living people
Senators of the 18th Congress of the Philippines
Heads of the Presidential Management Staff of the Philippines
Duterte administration cabinet members
Ateneo de Davao University alumni
Basketball players from Davao City
Maharlika Pilipinas Basketball League players
Filipino men's basketball players
Filipino politicians of Chinese descent
Guards (basketball)
Special Assistants to the President of the Philippines
Senators of the 19th Congress of the Philippines